Gurskøya is an island in Møre og Romsdal county, Norway. The  island is shared by the municipalities of Sande and Herøy.  The villages of Gursken, Larsnes, and Moldtustranda are located on the island.  The southern part of the island was historically part of the municipality of Rovde.  In 2015, there were 4,647 residents living on the island.

The island lies north of the Rovdestranda area on the mainland; southwest of the islands of Hareidlandet and Dimnøya, west of the island of Eika; east of the islands of Kvamsøya, Voksa, and Sandsøya; and south of the Norwegian Sea and the islands of Nerlandsøya, Bergsøya, Leinøya, and Flåvær.

The island is home to many fish-related industries such as fishing and fish processing.

Notable residents
Anne Leer, an author
Anlaug Amanda Djupvik, an astronomer

See also
 List of islands of Norway
 List of islands of Norway by area

References

Sande, Møre og Romsdal
Herøy, Møre og Romsdal
Islands of Møre og Romsdal
Sunnmøre